The Advertising Standards Authority of South Africa (abbreviated ASA) was an independent entity organised and financed by members of the marketing communications industry of South Africa.  Its purpose was to manage South Africa's voluntary, self-regulating system of advertising. The ASA worked with a variety of marketing communication industry stakeholders to ensure that advertising content in the country met the requirements of its Code of Advertising Practice and to control advertising content in the South African public's interest.  The ASA of South Africa's Code of Advertising Practice was based on the Consolidated ICC Code of Marketing and Advertising Communication Practice prepared by the International Chamber of Commerce. Member organisations, including advertisers, advertising agencies, and the media agreed upon advertising standards in the ASA code and worked to effect the swift correction or removal of any advertising that failed to meet their agreed-upon standards.

Member organisations include:
 Association for Communication and Advertising
 Association of Collective Investments (ACI)
 Cinemark (Pty) Ltd
 Cosmetic Toiletry & Fragrance Association of South Africa
 Furniture Traders' Association of South Africa
 Health Products Association of Southern Africa
 Hospital Association of South Africa
 Industry Association for Responsible Alcohol Use
 National Association of Broadcasters of South Africa
 Out of Home Media
 Pet Food Institute of Southern Africa, The
 Pharmaceutical Manufacturers' Association of South Africa
 Print Media SA
 Printing Industries Federation of South Africa
 Retail Motor Industry Organisation
 South African Optometric Association
 Timeshare Institute of Southern Africa

Notable rulings
 In 2008 ASA ruled that a television advertisement by GloMobile featuring Jeff Dunham's character Achmed the Dead Terrorist was offensive to Muslims and ordered GloMobile to withdraw the advertisement.

References

External links
 Official website 
 Code of Practice 

Consumer organisations in South Africa
Mass media complaints authorities
Advertising in South Africa
Self-regulatory organizations of the advertising industry
Regulation in South Africa